Charles de Lannoy (c. 1487 – 23 September 1527) was a soldier and statesman from the Low Countries in service of the Habsburg Emperors Maximilian I and Charles V.

Family 
He was a member of the noble de Lannoy family. Charles de Lannoy was born the younger son of Jean IV de Lannoy, Lord of Mingoval, himself nephew of Jean III de Lannoy. His mother was Philipotte de Lalaing (c. 1487). In 1509, he married Francoise de Montbel, with several children. In 1526 he became the first count of Lannoy and Mayordomo mayor to the Emperor. He was succeeded by his son Philip de Lannoy, 2nd Prince of Sulmona.

Career 
He took service with the Emperor Maximilian I and won distinction for bravery and leadership. He was appointed member to the council of Charles of Burgundy; later Emperor Charles V and his Caballerizo mayor in 1515. He was appointed knight of the Order of the Golden Fleece in 1516. He became governor of Tournai in 1521. He served as viceroy of Naples from 1522 to 1523. He became chief of Imperial armies in Italy upon the death of Prospero Colonna at the end of 1523.

His main experience was that of Imperial lieutenant during the Italian war of 1521-1525 and the War of the League of Cognac. He commanded the Battle of the Sesia (1524), and the siege of Marseille (1524) and Pavia (1525).

He died of a sudden illness in Naples on 23 September 1527.

References

1487 births
1527 deaths
People from Valenciennes
Belgian princes
Knights of the Golden Fleece
Military leaders of the Italian Wars
Viceroys of Naples
Generals of the Holy Roman Empire
Ch